Arlene Harris (July 7, 1896 – June 12, 1976) was a Canadian-born American radio, film, and television actress. (Another source gives her date of birth as July 7, 1898.) She was best known for her role as "the human chatterbox" on Al Pearce's radio program.

Early years
Harris was born in Toronto, Ontario, Canada, and was educated primarily in England. During the first three years of Harris's life, she was unable to hear. At age 5, she was entertaining her family with comedy sketches. When she was older, she "branched out into the art of impersonating."

Vaudeville
Harris toured in vaudeville as Arlene Francis in the 1920s. She had to retire after being injured in an automobile accident, but the Great Depression in the United States caused her to return to entertaining—this time in radio.

Radio
Before her career in film, Harris was well known as a comic actress on the radio program, The Chatterbox.

She first appeared on radio on KFWB in Hollywood, California. She was a regular on Al Pearce and His Gang, where she was known as "The Human Chatterbox" in monologues that involved telephone conversations with an unheard friend. A CBS statistician once calculated that she averaged four words per second during one of her rapid-fire monologues. She also co-starred with Pearce in Here Comes Elmer.

Harris played Mummy Higgins on The Baby Snooks Show and was heard on Ina Ray Hutton's program and Fare for Ladies.

Television
Harris played herself in an episode of The Dick Van Dyke Show in 1964,. She also appeared on Panorama Pacific and made guest appearances on several TV programs.

Recognition
Harris has a star at 6250 Hollywood Boulevard in the Radio section of the Hollywood Walk of Fame. It was dedicated February 8, 1960.

Personal life
Harris was married to Dr. Harry G. Harris.

Death
Harris died June 12, 1976, at the Motion Picture Country Home in Woodland Hills, California.

References

External links

1896 births
1976 deaths
Canadian emigrants to the United States
American film actresses
American radio actresses
American television actresses
People from Greater Los Angeles
Actresses from Toronto
20th-century American actresses